Rage: Warriors of the Apocalypse is a 1996 role-playing game supplement for Werewolf: The Apocalypse published by White Wolf Publishing.

Contents
Rage: Warriors of the Apocalypse is a sourcebook which contains Werewolf statistics and background for characters from the Rage collectible card game and for other Werewolf characters.

Reception
Mark Barter reviewed Rage: Warriors of the Apocalypse for Arcane magazine, rating it a 6 out of 10 overall. Barter comments that "The quality of the material deserves a higher rating, but the questionable value for money knocks off a couple of points."

Reviews
Dragon #234 (Oct 1996)

References

External links
Guide du Rôliste Galactique

Role-playing game books
Role-playing game supplements introduced in 1996
Werewolf: The Apocalypse